Megachile bituberculata is a species of bee in the family Megachilidae. It was described by Smith in 1879, and renamed by Ritsema in 1880; it occurs in Sub-Saharan Africa.

References

bituberculata
Insects described in 1879